Lee Seong-hui (born 26 September 1967) is a South Korean volleyball player. He competed at the 1988 Summer Olympics and the 1996 Summer Olympics.

References

1967 births
Living people
South Korean men's volleyball players
Olympic volleyball players of South Korea
Volleyball players at the 1988 Summer Olympics
Volleyball players at the 1996 Summer Olympics
Place of birth missing (living people)
Asian Games medalists in volleyball
Volleyball players at the 1994 Asian Games
Asian Games bronze medalists for South Korea
Medalists at the 1994 Asian Games
20th-century South Korean people